Melbourne tram route 8 was operated by Yarra Trams on the Melbourne tram network from Moreland to Toorak. The 15.7 kilometre route was operated out of Brunswick and Malvern depots with Z, B and D1 class trams. It ceased on 30 April 2017 and was replaced by routes route 6  and route 58.

History
Route 8 started on 17 October 2004, when the old route 8, which had been running between Melbourne University and Toorak merged with route 22 which had been running between Moreland and Arts Precinct.

In February 2015, Yarra Trams released plans to build a centre platform at Toorak, 100 metres west of the existing terminus. The work was completed in December 2015.

On 30 April 2017 as part of works associated with the closure of Domain Interchange and construction of Anzac railway station, route 8 ceased. The southern portion was replaced by extending route 55 from Domain Interchange to Toorak as route 58, while the northern section was replaced by extending route 6 from Melbourne University to Moreland.

Operation
Routes 8 was operated out of Brunswick and Malvern depots with Z, B and D1 class trams.

From 2016, D2 class trams from Brunswick depot operated on route 8, after the transfer from Southbank to Brunswick of this class to operate route 19.

Route map

References

External links

008
2004 establishments in Australia
2017 disestablishments in Australia